Dolerorthis is an extinct genus of hesperorthid brachiopod. The type species of this genus, D. interplicata, was described from the Silurian (Telychian) Osgood Formation (Indiana, United States). Other species belonging to this genus are known from the Ordovician and Silurian of Europe, Kazakhstan, China and Argentina.

References 

Prehistoric brachiopod genera
Silurian brachiopods